The 2019–20 Stanford Cardinal men's basketball team represented Stanford University during the 2019–20 NCAA Division I men's basketball season. The Cardinal were led by fourth-year head coach Jerod Haase and played their home games at Maples Pavilion as a member of the Pac-12 Conference. They finished the season 20–12, 9–9 in Pac-12 play to finish in seventh place. They lost in the first round of the Pac-12 tournament to California.

Previous season 
The Cardinal finished the 2018–19 season 15–16, 8–10 in Pac-12 play to finish in a three-way tie for eighth place, losing the tie-breakers against Arizona and USC ultimately finishing in tenth place. They lost in the first round of the Pac-12 tournament to the seven seed UCLA 79–72, finishing their year.

Offseason

Departures

2019 recruiting class

2020 Recruiting class

Roster

 Kodye Pugh will miss the entire 2019–20 season due to injury received on August 25 against SAM Basket Massagno.
 Trevor Stanback has retired from basketball, but will remain with the team as a student assistant coach.

Schedule and results

|-
!colspan=12 style=| Exhibition

|-
!colspan=12 style=| Non-conference regular season

|-
!colspan=12 style=| Pac-12 Regular season

|-
!colspan=12 style=| Pac-12 tournament

Source:

Ranking movement

*AP does not release post-NCAA Tournament rankings.^Coaches did not release a Week 2 poll.

References

Stanford Cardinal men's basketball seasons
Stanford
Stanford
Stanford